It's Showtime may refer to:

 It's Showtime (kickboxing), a kickboxing and martial arts promotion based in the Netherlands
 It's Showtime (Philippine TV program), a Philippine noontime variety show
 It's Showtime Indonesia, an Indonesian spin-off of the Philippine show
 It's Showtime (film), a film produced by Fred Weintraub in 1976

Music
 "It's Showtime!" (B'z song), a 2003 single by Japanese hard rock duo B'z from their album Big Machine
 "It's Showtime", a 1980 single by Katja Ebstein
 "It's Showtime", a 2003 single by American group The Mooney Suzuki
 "It's Showtime", a 2003 song by The Learning Station from their album Get Funky and Musical Fun
 "It's Showtime!", a track from the soundtrack of the 2015 video game Undertale by Toby Fox

See also
 Showtime (disambiguation)